Dawn Newman (born 8 April 1942 in Mount Hawthorn, Western Australia)
is an Australian former cricket player.
Newman played three Tests for the Australia women's national cricket team.

References

Living people
1942 births
Australia women Test cricketers